The 2011 Vancouver Whitecaps FC season was the Whitecaps' debut season in Major League Soccer. The MLS club has incorporated the history of its NASL and various lower division predecessors into its marketing campaigns, reflecting 36 years of professional soccer in Vancouver.

On March 19, 2011, Vancouver Whitecaps defeated Toronto FC at Empire Field in their league opening match by a score of 4–2. It was the first match between two Canadian clubs in league history. Vancouver Whitecaps gave up the 8,000th goal in league history in the game. The regular season ended at BC Place on October 22, 2011 with a 2–1 loss to Colorado Rapids leaving them in last place overall.

Players

Squad
Updated September 15, 2011.

Transfers in

Transfers out

Stats 
Last updated for match on October 22, 2011.

|}
* = Player is no longer with team

Starting XI 
MLS regular season matches only.

Club

Front Office and Staff

Competitions

Preseason
Before a six-week winter break, the Whitecaps trained for a week in Oxnard, California. During that period, they played an inter-squad scrimmage, as well as two matches against local fourth-tier PDL club Ventura County Fusion. The Whitecaps defeated the Fusion 2–1 on December 2, with goals from Terry Dunfield and Nizar Khalfan, and 3–1 on December 8, with goals from Nizar Khalfan, Kyle Porter and Terry Dunfield.

Winter Camp

Arizona training

Cascadia Summit

Overall

Major League Soccer

Vancouver Whitecaps FC's first regular season in Major League Soccer begins March 19, 2011 and ends October 22, 2011.

League table

Results summary

Results by round

Match results
Schedule

Nutrilite Canadian championship

The club participates in the Canadian Championship. The champion of the tournament qualifies for the Preliminary Round of the 2011–12 CONCACAF Champions League.

For the first time in the tournament's history, a playoff format was used as opposed to a round robin format. The tournament seeding was based on the results of the 2010 edition of the tournament, with Vancouver being seeded second. In their semi-final playoff with the Montreal Impact, the Whitecaps won the opening leg in Montreal 1–0 on a goal by Terry Dunfield. The second leg was contested in Vancouver, where Montreal led 1–0 after full-time, for an aggregate score of 1–1. Because both teams had scored one away goal, extra time was needed to determine the aggregate winner. In extra time, Mouloud Akloul scored on a rebound following an Alain Rochat free kick to send the Whitecaps to the final versus Toronto FC.

Semi-finals

Finals

World Football Challenge
On April 14 it was announced that the Whitecaps would host Manchester City as part of the 2011 World Football Challenge.

Cascadia Cup

The Whitecaps have had a long-standing rivalry with the Pacific Northwest clubs Seattle Sounders and Portland Timbers, dating back to the 1970s when ancestry clubs of the same name played in the original and now-defunct North American Soccer League. The tri-member tournament will continue with the expansion of the Whitecaps and the Timbers. The winner is determined through league matches between the sides, and the club with the best record against both sides wins the trophy.

The Cascadia Cup was awarded to the Seattle Sounders on September 24 when the Sounders defeated the Whitecaps 3–1 at Empire Field. Vancouver finished in third place after losing to Portland on October 2.

Recognition

MLS Player of the Week

MLS Goal of the Week

MLS Team of the Week

MLS All-Stars 2011

Miscellany

Allocation ranking 
Vancouver is in the No. 13 position in the MLS Allocation Ranking. The allocation ranking is the mechanism used to determine which MLS club has first priority to acquire a U.S. National Team player who signs with MLS after playing abroad, or a former MLS player who returns to the league after having gone to a club abroad for a transfer fee. Vancouver started 2011 ranked No. 1 on the allocation list and used its ranking to acquire Jay DeMerit. A ranking can be traded, provided that part of the compensation received in return is another club's ranking.

International roster spots 
Vancouver has 10 international roster spots. Each club in Major League Soccer is allocated 8 international roster spots, which can be traded. Vancouver acquired its first additional spot from Chivas USA on November 24, 2010 for use in the 2011 season only. On the same day Vancouver acquired a second additional spot from Colorado Rapids. Press reports did not indicate when, or if, this spot returns to Colorado. There is no limit on the number of international slots on each club's roster. The remaining roster slots must belong to domestic players. For clubs based in Canada, a domestic player is either a player with the legal right to work in Canada (i.e., Canadian citizen, permanent resident, part of a protected class) or a U.S. citizen, a permanent U.S. resident (green card holder) or the holder of other special U.S. status (e.g., refugee or asylum status).

Future draft pick trades 
Future picks acquired: None, but Vancouver has acquired undisclosed future considerations from Toronto FC which may or may not include draft pick(s).

Future picks traded: None.

References

Vancouver Whitecaps FC seasons
Vancouver Whitecaps
Vancouver Whitecaps